Football Club Esteghlal B Tehran (Persian: باشگاه فوتبال استقلال ب تهران) is an Iranian football club based in Tehran. It is the reserve team of Esteghlal Tehran, and currently plays in League 2, holding home matches at the Marghobkar Center.

Football clubs in Tehran